Martin D. Smith (born 30 June 1978) is a retired Danish football defender.

References

1978 births
Living people
Danish men's footballers
Brøndby IF players
Danish Superliga players
Association football defenders
Denmark under-21 international footballers
Footballers from Copenhagen